Neuregulin 4 also known as NRG4 is a member of the neuregulin protein family which in humans is encoded by the NRG4 gene.

Function
The neuregulins, including NRG4, activate erb-b2 receptor tyrosine kinase 4 (ERBB4) to initiating cell signaling through cytosolic tyrosine phosphorylation.

Clinical significance
Loss of expression of NRG4 is frequently seen in advanced bladder cancer while increased NRG4 expression correlates to better survival.

References

Further reading

Neurotrophic factors